Mark Hanna (January 1, 1917 – October 16, 2003) was an American screenwriter and actor.  He was known for writing the screenplays for many science fiction B movies in the 1950s, particularly Attack of the 50 Foot Woman.  His first major screenplay was Gunslinger in 1956.  He continued to be prolific through the mid-1960s, after which his film credits become sporadic.  His last screenplay was for Star Portal in 1998, five years before his death from stroke complications.

Select Credits
Southwest Passage (1954)
Flesh and the Spur (1957)
The Amazing Colossal Man (1957)
Attack of the 50 Foot Woman (1958)

References

External links
	

American male screenwriters
American male actors
1917 births
2003 deaths
20th-century American male writers
20th-century American screenwriters